Rollestone is a small village and former civil parish on Salisbury Plain in Wiltshire, England. It is near the River Till.

For local government purposes, Rollestone was added to Shrewton parish in 1934.

History
The name Rollestone was first used in the 13th century.

As Shrewton expanded in the 20th century, Rollestone became an area of Shrewton.

Rollestone Manor was built in the 18th century and is Grade II listed. As of 2015 it is a privately owned hotel and restaurant.

Church

The small 13th-century Anglican Church of St Andrew is Grade II* listed. It was declared redundant and is in the care of the Churches Conservation Trust.

Near the church is the former rectory, a mid-17th-century building altered in the 19th century.

Rollestone Camp
Military usage of land to the northeast of Rollestone began in the early 20th century, as artillery firing ranges which were later used by the Royal School of Artillery at Larkhill Camp.

Rollestone Camp was established in 1916 by the Royal Flying Corps for observation balloon training. Situated in an upland area of Wiltshire, it was described by one soldier stationed there as 'a bit bleak', especially for Australians used to a warmer climate. The water froze around Christmas time, and one night the troops' corrugated iron cinema was blown away.

Around this time the Amesbury and Military Camp Light Railway was extended from Larkhill to Rollestone and beyond; this extension remained in use until about 1923. Balloon-related usage of Rollestone Camp continued until 1939 when the site became a Royal Air Force Anti-Gas School, which closed in 1945.

For several months in 1980–81 the camp was used as a temporary prison (HMP Rollestone Camp) during industrial action by prison officers.

For 8 months in 1988, the camp became HMP Rollestone once more when it was used to relieve overcrowding in civilian prisons. The prison housed 360 category C prisoners. The prison governor was a HMP graded officer, the wing commanders were Military Provost staff (from Colchester military prison) and the wing staff were Royal Military Police NCOs, provided by the local Provost companies in nearby Tidworth and Bulford.

The camp continues in use as part of the Salisbury Plain Training Area.

References

External links
 
 
 
 

Villages in Wiltshire
Former civil parishes in Wiltshire